The .277 Fury or 6.8×51mm Common Cartridge, (designated as the .277 SIG Fury by the SAAMI) is a centerfire rimless bottlenecked rifle cartridge announced by SIG Sauer in late 2019.

Background
The cartridge was designed by SIG Sauer for the United States Army's Next Generation Squad Weapon Program (NGSW). It is dimensionally similar to the 7.62×51mm NATO service cartridge.

The cartridge was announced for non-military usage along with the SIG Sauer CROSS—a bolt-action, magazine-fed rifle—in December 2019. In 2020, it was accepted by the Sporting Arms and Ammunition Manufacturers' Institute (SAAMI) as a new cartridge and chambering. In 2022 SIG Sauer announced that it intends to commercially chamber the SIG MCX Spear semi-automatic rifle in .277 Fury.

Specifications
The cartridge uses a case that is the same length and diameter as the .308 Winchester. Each "hybrid" cartridge case consists of a stainless steel base coupled to a brass body via an aluminium locking washer.
Stainless steel has a significantly higher yield strength than brass, allowing the engineers to use higher maximum average pressure (MAP) chamber pressure levels. Bullets are either  "match grade" with a G1 ballistic coefficient of ≈ .488  or   "hunter tipped" with a G1 ballistic coefficient of ≈ .508 (ballistic coefficients are somewhat debatable).
These projectile ballistic coefficients are equal to the publicized specifications of the Sierra .277  HPBT MatchKing and .277  TGK GameKing projectiles.
The SAAMI warns that MAP levels greater than  may present an increased risk of unsafe cartridge case or firearm rupture and thus require cartridge case and firearm designs that depart from traditional practices (materials, construction, and other design criteria).
It also means that the .277 Fury is normally chambered in small arms that are capable of handling the accompanying bolt thrust safely.

Cartridge dimensions 

.277 Fury SAAMI cartridge dimensions: The drawing has a mix of sizes in inches as well as millimeters in parenthesis (2022)

Performance
Reduced-power .277 Fury ammunition, which does not employ the stainless steel case head (.277 Fury Elite ball FMJ), and thus cannot achieve pressure above current SAAMI brass specifications, is virtually identical to the commonly available 7mm-08 Remington, which was developed in 1980. The bullet diameter of the .277 Fury cartridge is close to that of the 7mm-08 Remington, the difference in diameter is 0.006 inch (0.15 mm) or approximately the thickness of two human hairs. The muzzle velocity and downrange energy of the reduced-power .277 Fury without stainless steel case head and 7mm-08 Remington are also practically identical in similarly weighted bullets with similar ballistic coefficients.

Reduced-power .277 Fury ammunition (.277 Fury Elite ball FMJ) performs close to the brass-cased .270/308 Winchester wildcat rifle cartridge, that has a case capacity of 3.5 ml (54 grains) H2O and the bullet, diameter-wise, fills a position between the .260 Remington and 7mm-08 Remington rifle cartridges.

Military award and designation as 6.8 common cartridge

In January 2019, the United States military began the Next Generation Squad Weapon Program to find replacements for the M4 carbine and M249 light machine gun. On April 19, 2022, the United States Army announced that it had selected SIG Sauer to build the XM7 rifle to (partly) replace the M4 carbine, while the XM250 automatic rifle was to replace the M249 SAW in the LMG role. In both cases it had selected the company's Fury ammunition utilizing government provided projectiles and vendor-designed cartridges as the new weapons' ammunition. 

The XM5 was designed to fire the 6.8×51mm SIG Fury cartridge in response to concerns that improvements in body armor would diminish the effectiveness of the 5.56×45mm NATO round used in the M4 carbine and M249 SAW and increase their lethality and effective range compared to common battlefield rounds such as the 5.56×45mm NATO and 7.62×51mm NATO.

Operational testing of the XM5 rifle, XM250 automatic rifle, XM157 fire control optic platform agnostic unit and the 6.8×51mm ammunition squad weaponry is expected to begin in 2024. However, this does not guarantee actual widespread future issue. The military designation for this round is 6.8 common cartridge.

Military solicitation
As of March 2022 the United States Army has a solicitation ongoing for a M240 machine gun 6.8×51mm conversion kit for the 7.62×51mm NATO-chambered M240B and M240L general-purpose machine guns.

See also 
 6.8 Western, a cartridge improving upon the initial .270 Winchester and subsequent unstable .270 WSM with a modified case to accommodate longer heavy-for-caliber bullets with a faster twist rate to stabilize the higher BC bullets.
 .276 Pedersen, a 1923 experimental cartridge developed for the United States Army
 7 mm caliber
 List of rifle cartridges

References

External links
 New for 2020: SIG Sauer .277 SIG Fury Ammunition via YouTube
 .277 SIG Fury SAAMI Drawing

SIG Sauer cartridges
Pistol and rifle cartridges
Weapons and ammunition introduced in 2019